Ibrakadabra is the second extended play (EP) by German rapper Capital Bra, released digitally on 9 May 2017 through Team Kuku, Chapter One and Auf!Keinen!Fall!.

Background
Capital Bra released his second studio album Makarov Komplex three months prior to Ibrakadabra. The EP was released without prior announcement on 9 May 2017.

Commercial performance
The EP attained minor commercial success in Switzerland, where it debuted at No. 77. It left the chart the following week.

Track listing

Charts

References

Capital Bra albums
2017 albums